Surp Hovhannes Church (translates to the "Church of Saint John") is an important 10th century basilica located in the village of Byurakan in the Aragatsotn Province of Armenia.  Not very far away from S. Hovhannes in the same village, are the ruins of the Artavazik Church of the 7th century with a huge 13th-century khachkar monument directly across the ravine from the structure.

Architecture
Surp Hovhannes has two portals that lead into the building. The main entrance is from the side of the church, and has an inscription upon the lintel above the portal. Indications of the structure's age can be seen in the temple style steps leading up to S. Hovhannes and the Maltese Crosses carved into the façade. 

Khachkars and other decorative stones may be found around the premises.

Gallery

References

Bibliography

External links
 Armeniapedia.org: Byurakan Church

Christian monasteries in Armenia
Armenian Apostolic churches in Armenia
Tourist attractions in Aragatsotn Province
Churches in Aragatsotn Province
10th-century churches in Armenia